Phycitodes subcretacella is a species of snout moth. It was described from Japan, but is also found in Spain and Russia.

References

Phycitini
Moths described in 1901
Moths of Asia
Moths of Europe
Moths of Japan